Kvartsittkammen is a mountain ridge in Wedel Jarlsberg Land at Spitsbergen, Svalbard. It has a length of about 8.5 kilometers, and is a located between the glaciers of Tverrbreen and Bjørnbreen.

References

Mountains of Spitsbergen